Barthélemy Adoukonou (born 24 August 1942) is a Beninese Catholic bishop. He is the Secretary of the Pontifical Council for Culture since his appointment by Pope Benedict XVI on 3 December 2009. He was previously Secretary-General both of the Conférence Épiscopale Régionale de l'Afrique de l'Ouest Francophone and of the Association of Episcopal Conferences of Anglophone West Africa, and a consultor of the Pontifical Council for Promoting Christian Unity. As well as the languages of the two West African international conferences, he speaks Italian and German.

Ecclesiastical career
Adoukonou was born in Abomey, Benin in 1942. He was ordained priest on 16 December 1966. After teaching in the Saint Joan of Arc minor seminary of Ouidah (1967–1968), and being chaplain and teacher at the Aufiais College in Cotonou (1968–1970), and assistant parish priest of St Francis of Assisi at Bohicon, Abomey (1970–1971), he spent 1971 to 1977 continuing his studies in religious sociology in Paris, and then of theology at the University of Regensburg, where he earned his doctorate. He was meant to present his dissertation to the Joseph Ratzinger in June 1977, but Ratzinger suddenly asked him to finish it earlier so he could move the presentation forward to March. Between 1977 and 1984 he was rector of the Minor Seminary of St. Paul at Djimi, Abomey, Missionary Professor at the University of West Africa in Abidjan and professor of methodology of research in human and social sciences at the University of the State of Abomey-Calavi and at the Major Seminary of Saint Gall in Ouidah, Benin. From 1988 to 1999 he was Rector of the Benin Propaedeutic Seminary at Missérété, Porto Novo.

In the late 70s, Adoukonou was a student of the then professor Joseph Ratzinger at the University of Regensburg. He kept in touch with his former professor, turned Archbishop, then a month later, Cardinal, going on to become Prefect of the Congregation for the Doctrine of the Faith, and finally Pope in 2005, under the name of Benedict XVI. At the end of 2009 when the nomination of the new Secretary of the Pontifical Council for Culture was due to take place, its president Gianfranco Ravasi, spoke to the Pope Benedict, suggesting the possible addition of a figure from Africa, to assist him as he felt that the Roman Curia was at risk of becoming too Italianised. Benedict seized the opportunity stating: “I have a candidate,” giving Adoukonou’s name to Ravasi. In December 2009, Adoukonou was appointed the secretary, or second-ranking official, of the Pontifical Council for Culture.

Adoukonou, is a member of the Ratzinger Schulerkreis (an informal group composed of Ratzinger’s former students) and accordingly, he participated in it 2011 annual meeting which discussed new evangelization.

On 10 September 2011, Adoukonou was appointed Titular Bishop of Zama Minor. He received episcopal consecration at the hands of Cardinal Secretary of State Tarcisio Bertone on 8 October 2011 along with Giuseppe Sciacca.

On 29 December 2011 he was appointed a member of the Pontifical Council for Social Communications for a five-year renewable term.

References

Living people
1942 births
21st-century Roman Catholic titular bishops
Beninese Roman Catholic bishops
Paris Descartes University alumni
Members of the Pontifical Council for Culture
Members of the Pontifical Council for Social Communications